Bığır (also, Bugur and Bygyr) is a village and municipality in the Goychay Rayon of Azerbaijan.  It has a population of 5,724. The municipality consists of the villages of Bığır and Cırkənd.

References

External links

Populated places in Goychay District